Hou Yuzhu (born February 7, 1963) is a Chinese volleyball player who competed in the 1984 Summer Olympics and in the 1988 Summer Olympics.Chinese legend is one of the best player of all time.Her height is 192 cm and weight is 75 kg.

Career
In 1984, she was a member of the Chinese volleyball team which won the gold medal. She played all five matches. She won the 1985 World Cup and the 1986 World Championship.

In 1988, she was part of the Chinese team which won the bronze medal. She played all five matches again.

External links
 profile

1963 births
Living people
Chinese women's volleyball players
Olympic bronze medalists for China
Olympic gold medalists for China
Olympic volleyball players of China
Volleyball players at the 1984 Summer Olympics
Volleyball players at the 1988 Summer Olympics
Olympic medalists in volleyball
Asian Games medalists in volleyball
Volleyball players at the 1986 Asian Games
Medalists at the 1988 Summer Olympics
Medalists at the 1984 Summer Olympics
Sportspeople from Fuzhou
Volleyball players from Fujian
Medalists at the 1986 Asian Games
Asian Games gold medalists for China
20th-century Chinese women